The Milwaukee Brewers are a Major League Baseball franchise based in Milwaukee, Wisconsin. Established in Seattle, Washington, as the Seattle Pilots in 1969, the team became the Milwaukee Brewers after relocating to Milwaukee in 1970. The franchise played in the American League until 1998 when it moved to the National League in conjunction with a major league realignment. This list documents players and teams who hold records set in various statistical areas during single seasons or their team careers.

Table key

Career records

Career batting

These are records of players with the best performance in distinct statistical batting categories during their career with the Brewers.

Career pitching

These are records of players with the best performance in distinct statistical pitching categories during their career with the Brewers.

Single-season records

Single-season batting

These are records of players with the best performance in distinct statistical batting categories during a single season.

Single-season pitching

These are records of players with the best performance in distinct statistical pitching categories during a single season.

Team season records

These team records exclude the 1981, 1994, 1995, and 2020 shortened seasons.

Season general

These are records of Brewers teams with the best and worst performances in distinct statistical categories during a single season.

Season batting

These are records of Brewers teams with the best and worst performances in distinct statistical batting categories during a single season.

Season pitching

These are records of Brewers teams with the best and worst performances in distinct statistical pitching categories during a single season.

Season fielding
These are records of Brewers teams with the best and worst performances in distinct statistical fielding categories during a single season.

References

Records
Milwaukee Brewers